Culver may refer to:

Places

United Kingdom
Culver Down, Isle of Wight

United States
Culver, Indiana, a town in northern Indiana
Culver, Kansas, a city in north-central Kansas
Culver, Kentucky, an unincorporated community
Culver, Missouri, a ghost town
Culver, Oregon, a city in central Oregon
Culver, Minnesota, an unincorporated community in northeast Minnesota
Culver Township, St. Louis County, Minnesota, a township in northeast Minnesota
Culver City, California, a city in Los Angeles County; a significant center for motion picture and television production
 Culver City station
Culver Lake, a lake straddling the Minnesota-South Dakota line
Culver Line (disambiguation), multiple transit lines in Brooklyn

Other uses 
 Culver (surname)
 Culver Academies (Culver Military Academy / Culver Girls Academy), a boarding school and summer camp program
 Culver Aircraft Company
 Culver Boulevard Median bicycle path
 Culver Drive, a major arterial road in Irvine, California
 Culver's, a restaurant chain in the United States
 Culver, a pigeon or a dove (less-common English word)